The Adelaide Trades Hall is the Trades Hall building in the South Australian city of Adelaide established in 1896.

It is the location of the United Trades and Labour Council of South Australia, also known as SA Unions. It is located at 11-16 South Terrace, Adelaide.

Notes

See also
Australian labour movement

Trades halls in Australia
South Terrace, Adelaide